Kisoga is a settlement in Central Uganda. It is a suburb of the town of Kanoni, the administrative, commercial and political headquarters of Gomba District.

Location
The coordinates of Kisoga, Gomba are:0°11'55.0"N, 31°57'01.0"E (Latitude:0.198611; Longitude:31.950278).

See also

References

External links
 Kisoga, Gomba Elevation Data

Populated places in Central Region, Uganda
Gomba District
Kisoga